Eliza Bridell Fox, née Eliza Florance Fox (1824–1903), was a British painter and teacher.

Family background
She was born in Hackney as the daughter of William Johnson Fox, preacher and politician, Unitarian minister of the South Place Chapel, and Eliza nee Florance. He was a friend of radical journalist Benjamin Flower. On Flower's death in 1829, his two daughters, Eliza Flower and Sarah Fuller Flower Adams, became William Johnson Fox's wards. Mr and Mrs Fox separated in the 1830s, and, causing much scandal, her father apparently took her and her siblings to set up home with Eliza Flower. This unconventional family unit lived first in Stamford Hill and later Bayswater.

Education and early career
Eliza Fox was known as 'Tottie', and had initially wanted to go on the stage, though her father (despite his habit of lying on a sofa, giving Shakespearean readings), was nervous about this.  He consulted his friend William Macready, who told her she was too small, and so she took up art at the age of twenty. While her father believed in the value of an education for women, he felt that the art of drawing was unnecessary, leading Eliza initially to study by herself. Eliza became a copyist by first studying Bernhard Siegfried Albinus' Anatomy, which her father bought for her, and later, by copying paintings in the National Gallery and the British Museum. Receiving encouragement from artists, she finally convinced her father to let her study for three years at Sass's Academy under the directorship of Francis Stephen Cary. Here she studied alongside Anna Mary Howitt, who had a career as a painter and writer, and whose parents were friends of the novelist Elizabeth Gaskell.  In 1847 Eliza graduated and her pastel portrait of her father was shown in 1847 at the Royal Academy. The next year she showed a historical portrait of Gainsborough when a boy sketching from Nature.

She then started to hold drawing evenings at home in her father's library where she and other women artists could draw from "undraped" (i.e. nude) models. After a few years she began instruction with the purpose of educating women to the point that they would qualify for admittance to the Royal Academy schools, and one of her students, Laura Herford, succeeded on the basis of a drawing that only included her first initials. Herford was admitted to the Antique School as the first woman to do so.

In 1849, she first met Elizabeth Gaskell, who had recently gained much notice through her first novel Mary Barton, and they subsequently became close friends.

Marriages and later career
In 1858 Fox went to Rome, where she married Frederick Lee Bridell the next year. She remained in Italy, painting alongside her husband and accompanying him on trips until he died in 1862. In this period she is known for portraits of visiting friends and their company. She then took a long trip to Algiers where she continued to make portraits of visitors. In 1871 she remarried a second time to her cousin George Edward Fox, and resumed her maiden name.

References

External links

 Eliza Bridell Fox on artnet
 

1824 births
1903 deaths
Artists from London
19th-century British painters
British women painters
19th-century British women artists